The acronym AGMC may refer to:

 Afghan German Management College
 Agartala Government Medical College
 Atlanta Gay Men's Chorus
 Association du Génie Militaire Canadien